The spin Nernst effect is a phenomenon of spin separation caused by the thermal flow of electrons in condensed matter. Spin-up and spin-down electrons are separated without the application of a magnetic field. This effect is similar to the spin Hall effect, where an electrical current leads to spin separation.

The effect was first experimentally observed in 2016 and published by two independent groups in 2017.

References  

Condensed matter physics
Spintronics
Walther Nernst